Lambros, also spelled Lampros (Λάμπρος) is Greek masculine first ("Christian") name and surname or family name. Lambros means "shining, bright, radiant". It is related to the nominalized adjective Lambri (Λαμπρή), meaning the Easter Sunday. As a name it is mostly found in Cyprus, Central Greece and the Peloponnese. People bearing this first name, celebrate their Name day on Easter Sunday. The usual female form is Lambrini (Λαμπρινή).

People
Lambros Katsonis
Lambros Choutos
Lambros Koromilas
Lambros Konstantaras
Lambros D. Callimahos
Lambros Koutsonikas
Lambros Tsoumaris 
As surname:
Spyridon Lambros

Greek masculine given names